The Men's under-23 time trial of the 2014 UCI Road World Championships took place in and around Ponferrada, Spain on 22 September 2014.

The world title was won by Australia's Campbell Flakemore – who finished fourth in the event in 2013 – and in the process, became the fourth Australian rider in the last six years to win the title. Flakemore completed the course just 0.48 seconds quicker than the silver medallist Ryan Mullen of the Republic of Ireland, while the bronze medal was taken by Swiss rider Stefan Küng, 9.22 seconds behind Flakemore.

Qualification

All National Federations were allowed to enter four riders for the race, with a maximum of two riders to start. In addition to this number, the outgoing World Champion and the current continental champions were also able to take part.

Schedule
All times are in Central European Time (UTC+1).

Participating nations
63 cyclists from 40 nations took part in the men's under-23 time trial. The number of cyclists per nation is shown in parentheses.

  Algeria (2)
  Argentina (2)
  Australia (1)
  Austria (2)
  Azerbaijan (1)
  Belgium (2)
  Chile (1)
  Colombia (2)
  Croatia (1)
  Denmark (2)
  France (2)
  Great Britain (2)
  Germany (2)
  Greece (1)
  Honduras (1)
  Ireland (1)
  Italy (2)
  Kazakhstan (3)
  Luxembourg (1)
  Morocco (2)
  Moldova (1)
  Mexico (1)
  Netherlands (1)
  Norway (1)
  New Zealand (2)
  Poland (1)
  Portugal (1)
  Qatar (1)
  Romania (1)
  Russia (2)
  Rwanda (2)
  Singapore (1)
  Slovenia (1)
  South Africa (2)
  Spain (2) (host)
  Sweden (2)
  Switzerland (3)
  Turkey (2)
  Ukraine (1)
  United States (2)

Prize money
The UCI assigned premiums for the top 3 finishers with a total prize money of €5,367.

Final classification

References

Men's under-23 time trial
UCI Road World Championships – Men's under-23 time trial
2014 in men's road cycling